was a feudal domain under the Tokugawa shogunate of Edo period Japan, located in Shimōsa Province (the northern portion of Chiba Prefecture and southern portion of Ibaraki Prefecture in modern-day, Japan). It was centered on Sekiyado Castle in what is now the city of Noda, Chiba.

Prime Minister Baron Suzuki Kantarō was born as the son of a samurai of Sekiyado Domain.

History
Sekiyado is located at the confluence of the Tone River and the Edo River, and was thus a strategic location controlling river traffic in the northern Kantō region, as well as the northeastern approaches to Edo. Following the Battle of Odawara in 1590, the Kantō region by was assigned by Toyotomi Hideyoshi to Tokugawa Ieyasu, who appointed his half-brother Matsudaira (Hisamatsu) Yasumoto as daimyō of the newly formed Sekiyado Domain, with revenues of 20,000 koku. His revenues were increased to 40,000 koku in 1591. The domain passed from Matsudaira control to various other clans over its history: however, as an indication of the importance the Tokugawa shogunate placed on Sekiyado, of the 22 daimyōs who ruled the domain, 22 held the post of Rōjū and three held the post of Kyoto Shoshidai.

From 1669 (with an interruption from 1683 to 1705), the domain remained in the hands of the Kuze clan. Kuze Hirochika played an important role in the Bakumatsu period. As Rōjū, he opposed the Ansei Purge conducted by Ii Naosuke. He was a key supporter of the Kōbu gattai policy of supporting the Shogunate through marriage ties to the Imperial family, and one of the prime signatories to treaties ending Japan’s national isolation policy.

During the Boshin War, the domain officially remained a supporter of the shogunate, and contributed many samurai to the Shōgitai; however, many of its younger retainers supported the Sonnō jōi movement and defected to the Satchō Alliance. After the Battle of Ueno, the final daimyō of Sekiyado, Kuze Hironari, submitted to the new Meiji government. He was appointed domain governor under the new administration, until the abolition of the han system in July 1871 and subsequently became a viscount under the kazoku peerage. The former Sekiyado Domain was absorbed into the new Chiba Prefecture.

Holdings at the end of the Edo period
As with most domains in the han system, Sekiyado Domain consisted of several discontinuous territories calculated to provide the assigned kokudaka, based on periodic cadastral surveys and projected agricultural yields.

Shimōsa Province
48 villages in Sashima District
22 villages in Katsushika District
48 villages in Soma District
Mutsu Province (Iwashiro Province)
6 villages in Shinobu District
Hitachi Province
14 villages in Shida District
2 villages in Tsukuba District
Shimotsuke Province
19 villages in Tsuga District
7 villages in Kawachi District
Izumi Province
9 villages in Izumi District

List of daimyōs

References

External links
 Sekiyado on "Edo 300 HTML"

Notes

Domains of Japan
1590 establishments in Japan
States and territories established in 1590
1871 disestablishments in Japan
States and territories disestablished in 1871
Shimōsa Province
History of Chiba Prefecture